The Royal Albanian Guard was from 1928 till 1939 and was part of the Royal Albanian Army.

Structure

In April 1939 this reportedly had a strength of 926 officers and men. 
"ceremonial" company 
infantry battalion 
Hqs 
4 rifle companies 
artillery battery 
cavalry squadron (extrapolated from a film footage of a parade about 1938) 
Hqs 
3-4 troops 
officer 
2 sections 
9 troopers 
Royal Band 
Depot 

The infantry battalion was reported as having 21 officers, 37 officers and 422 corporals and guardsmen, but note this is the strength of the light establishment infantry battalion. A strength of 562 was reported in the late Thirties. In April 1939 the Italians found in five companies (including the ceremonial?) 
28 officers (4 Italian) 
6 senior NCO ("marescialli") 
48 sergeants 
522 corporals and guardsmen 

The artillery battery is given in Albanian sources as 
4 officers 
8 NCO 
140 guardsmen 
59 horses 
4 x  Skoda 75mm L/13 mountain guns 

The cavalry squadron is given in various sources as 71-91 officers and men, up from a single troop of about 32 in the late Twenties. 

When the band was incorporated into the Italian army it had 34 members and the depot, 1 officer and 39 men. 

Half the army appeared to be deployed around Tiranë to protect the central government from civil unrest, and the Royal Guard to protect the King from assassination and military coups. Different sources report that the guard was recruited in the south (Greek Orthodox, as opposed to the Muslims that inhabited the Tiranë region), or in the north (the Mahti region, Muslim, but also King Zog's home and power base), and the Italians re-organized the Guard into a battalion with two oversize companies ("North" in trousered uniforms and "South", kilted as the Greek Evzones).  It is probable that two infantry companies were from the south and two from the north, with the ceremonial company having contingents from both.

Royal Albanian Army